

References 

https://www.indmount.org/IMF/getPeaks

https://hpgeneralstudies.com/mountain-peaks-himachal-pradesh/

Himachal Pradesh
Himachal Pradesh-related lists